Pieter M. Judson (born 1956, Utrecht) is professor of history. He has taught history at Swarthmore College, and is currently a professor of 19th and 20th century history at the European University Institute in Florence.

His research interests include modern European History, nationalist conflicts, revolutionary and counter revolutionary social movements, and the history of sexuality.

Education

Pieter Judson attended Swarthmore College and graduated in 1978.

Awards

He is a 2010 recipient of the Guggenheim Fellowship and received two Fulbright awards to Vienna, as a student and scholar.
In Spring 2011, Pieter Judson was the recipient of Nina Maria Gorrissen Berlin Prize in History at the American Academy in Berlin.

Publications

Exclusive Revolutionaries: Liberal Politics, Social Experience, and National Identity in the Austrian Empire 1848—1914 (1996, winner of the Herbert Baxter Adams prize of the American Historical Association and the Austrian Cultural Institute's Prize for best book both of 1997)
Wien Brennt. Die Revolution 1848 und ihre liberale Erbe (1998)
Constructing nationalities in East Central Europe. New York; Oxford: Berghahn, 2005.
Guardians of the nation: activists on the language frontiers of imperial Austria. Cambridge, Mass.: Harvard University Press, 2006.
 The Habsburg Empire. A New History. Harvard University Press, Cambridge (Massachusetts)/London 2016, 
Habsburg: Geschichte eines Imperiums: 1740 - 1918. München: C.H. Beck, 2017.
“Nationalism in the Era of the Nation State” in Helmut W. Smith, ed., The Oxford Handbook of Modern German History, Oxford University Press, 2011.
“Nationalism and Indifference” in Habsburg Neu Denken. Vielfalt und Ambivalenz in Zentraleuropa. 30 Kulturwissenschatliche Stichworte.Vienna: Böhlau, 2016.

References

1956 births
Living people
Swarthmore College faculty
Swarthmore College alumni
21st-century American historians
21st-century American male writers
20th-century Dutch historians
Writers from Utrecht (city)
American male non-fiction writers